Glen Jacob Cressman (August 29, 1934 – June 1, 2019) was a Canadian professional ice hockey forward who played four games in the National Hockey League for the Montreal Canadiens.

References

External links

1934 births
2019 deaths
Canadian ice hockey centres
Ice hockey people from Ontario
Kitchener Greenshirts players
Montreal Canadiens players
People from the Regional Municipality of Waterloo
Rochester Americans players
Toronto Marlboros players